Wigtown was a royal burgh that returned one commissioner to the Parliament of Scotland and to the Convention of Estates.

After the Acts of Union 1707, Wigtown, New Galloway, Stranraer and Whithorn formed the Wigtown district of burghs, returning one member between them to the House of Commons of Great Britain.

List of burgh commissioners

 1661: Thomas Stewart 
 1662–63, 1665 convention: Adam McKie, provost 
 1667 convention: John McKie, town clerk 
 1669–72: William McKie 
 1673–74: William Cluiston 
 1678 convention: Patrick Stewart, bailie 
 1681–82, 1685–86, 1689 convention, 1689–1702, 1702-07: William Coltrane of Drummorrell, provost

See also
 List of constituencies in the Parliament of Scotland at the time of the Union

References

Constituencies of the Parliament of Scotland (to 1707)
Constituencies disestablished in 1707
1707 disestablishments in Scotland
Wigtown
History of Dumfries and Galloway
Politics of Dumfries and Galloway